The 2015 Reigate and Banstead Borough Council election took place on 7 May 2015 to elect exactly one third of members to Reigate and Banstead Borough Council in England coinciding with other local elections held simultaneously with a General Election which resulted in increased turnout compared to the election four years before.  All currently drawn wards of the United Kingdom in this area are three-member and are contested in three years out of four.

Results
Conservatives gained three seats, adding to councillors within the group with overall control of the council.

Ward by ward
		

     
      
      						
		

     
      
      						
		

     
      
      						
		

     
      
      						
		

     
      
      						
		

     
      
      						
		

     
      
      						
		
			Turnout 66.4%

References

2015 English local elections
May 2015 events in the United Kingdom
2015
2010s in Surrey